Gloria Anne Borger (born September 22, 1952) is an American political pundit, journalist, and columnist. Borger is the chief political analyst at CNN. Since joining CNN in 2007, she has appeared on a variety of their shows, including The Situation Room.

Borger was previously the national political correspondent for CBS News where she appeared on CBS's Face the Nation and 60 Minutes II. From 2002 to 2004, Borger was the co-anchor of CNBC's Capital Report. Prior to that, she was a contributing editor and columnist for U.S. News & World Report magazine. Borger covered the Three Mile Island accident for Newsweek in 1979.

Early life 

Gloria Borger was born on the 22nd of September 1952 in New Rochelle, New York. Borger attended New Rochelle High School from where she graduated in 1970. She later joined Colgate University where she graduated in 1974. She was born in a Jewish family where her father owned an electrical distributions company named Borger’s. Borger grew up in New Rochelle, New York.

Education 

Borger was educated at New Rochelle High School, from which she graduated in 1970, followed by Colgate University, graduating in 1974.

Awards and honors 

Borger received a National Headliners Award for her 2013 program Marriage Warriors: Showdown at the Supreme Court. She was part of the team awarded a Primetime Emmy Award for Outstanding Live Coverage for CNN's 2012 US election night coverage, as well as CNN's Peabody Award-winning coverage of the 2008 Presidential Primary campaigns and debates. Borger received an Emmy nomination for her 2010 piece "The Odd Couple", profiling attorneys David Boies and Ted Olson.

Personal life 

Borger lives in Washington, D.C., with her husband, Lance Morgan, a public relations executive. She has two sons. Her son Evan is married to Mary Anne Huntsman, daughter of politician Jon Huntsman Jr.

References

External links 

 CNN Profile
 CBS News Profile
  Gloria Borger's Blog on US News & World Report
 

1952 births
Colgate University alumni
Living people
Writers from New Rochelle, New York
American television reporters and correspondents
American political commentators
Place of birth missing (living people)
CNN people
Journalists from New York (state)
Television personalities from New Rochelle, New York
New Rochelle High School alumni